Roger Bean (born March 20, 1962) is a writer and director who specializes in jukebox musicals.

Bean wrote The Marvelous Wonderettes, which played Off-Broadway at the Westside Theatre in New York City. The Marvelous Wonderettes was first written for the Milwaukee Repertory Theater, where Bean created various other musicals utilizing established and lesser-known radio and popular hits. The Andrews Brothers, Winter Wonderettes, Don't Touch That Dial!, Route 66, That's Amoré, Life Could Be A Dream, Honky Tonk Laundry and Why Do Fools Fall In Love? have been produced in various theaters across the country (Musical Theatre West, Welk Resort Theatre, Delaware Theatre Company, Oregon Cabaret Theatre, The Laguna Playhouse, Madison Repertory Theatre, Fullerton Civic Light Opera, Phoenix Theatre, Water Tower Theatre, Invisible Theatre, and many others). In 2007, The Marvelous Wonderettes received the Los Angeles Ovation Award for Best Musical Intimate Theatre, and played a record-setting 18 months at the El Portal Theatre in North Hollywood, California. Bean was also nominated for two Ovation Awards for Direction of a Musical for the Los Angeles productions of The Marvelous Wonderettes and Winter Wonderettes.

Roger Bean's work as a director has been seen on the stages of the Milwaukee Repertory Theater, Delaware Theatre Company, The Laguna Playhouse, Utah Shakespeare Festival, Madison Repertory Theatre, Oregon Cabaret Theatre, Skylight Music Theatre, and numerous stages in between. Bean directed the premiere of Lend Me a Tenor: The Musical at the Utah Shakespeare Festival, written by Peter Sham and Brad Carroll, based on the Tony Award-winning play by Ken Ludwig.

Bean is the Executive Director of Steele Spring Productions, a theatrical licensing and royalty company, and is a member of the Stage Directors and Choreographers Society and the Dramatists Guild.

Works 
The Marvelous Wonderettes
The Marvelous Wonderettes: Dream On
The Marvelous Wonderettes: Caps & Gowns
Winter Wonderettes
Summer of Love
The Andrews Brothers
Don't Touch That Dial!
Route 66
That's Amoré
Life Could Be A Dream
Honky Tonk Laundry
Why Do Fools Fall In Love?

References

External links
 
 http://www.broadway.com/The-Marvelous-Wonderettes/broadway_show/569484
 http://www.steelespring.com

Living people
1962 births